The Ma'ale Akrabim massacre, known in English as the Scorpions Pass Massacre, was an attack on an Israeli passenger bus, carried out on 17 March 1954, in the middle of the day. Eleven passengers were shot dead by the attackers who ambushed and boarded the bus. One passenger died 32 years later of his injuries, in a state of paralysis and partial consciousness. Four passengers survived, two of whom had been injured by the gunmen.

Background
Scorpions Pass (Ma'ale Akrabim) is a narrow, winding grade on the old road connecting Eilat and Beersheba, just south of Makhtesh Katan, and roughly 60 miles south of Beersheba. The pass was on the primary route between Eilat and central Israel in 1954. The 1948 Arab–Israeli war ended with the signing of several armistice agreements between Israel and her neighboring Arab states, but border clashes began almost immediately after the signing agreements. On the Israeli–Jordanian border lines, infiltrations, unarmed (71%) and armed (29%), were not infrequent from both sides.

According to Israeli sources, between June 1949 and the end of 1952, a total of 57 Israelis, mostly civilians, were killed by infiltrators from Jordan. The Israeli death toll for the first 9 months of 1953 was 32.

Over roughly the same time (November 1950 – November 1953), the Hashemite Kingdom of Jordan/Israel Mixed Armistice Commission (HJK/IMAC) condemned Israeli military reprisal actions 44 times and claimed it suffered 629 killed and injured from Israeli incursions.

Similar attacks, carried out largely by Palestinian commandos likely with some Egyptian support, originated from across the Egyptian border and the Gaza strip. Israel historian Benny Morris states that, between 1949 and 1956, between 200 and 250 Israelis were killed by infiltrators and a similar number of Israeli soldiers were killed in action. Other sources give a total of 1,300 killed over this period. Morris wrote, in Israel's Border Wars, 1949–1956, that "Israel's defensive anti-infiltration measures resulted in the death (sic) of several thousand mostly unarmed Arabs during 1949–56."

A group called the "Black Hand", composed of predominantly Bedouins from 'Azazme and Tarrabin tribes living within the al-Auja Demilitarised zone, were carrying out 'revenge raids' principally against suspected informers but also against Israeli targets.

In the Negev, Israel embarked on development projects, which became the target of theft by Bedouins. Israeli security forces' shooting of these Bedouin had created blood feuds in the area.

The attack

On the night of 16 March, a bus operated by the Egged Israel Transport Cooperative Society on an unscheduled journey carrying 14 passengers made its way from Eilat to Tel Aviv. As it was ascending the steep grade, it was ambushed by gunmen who shot and killed the driver as well as passengers who tried to escape; they then proceeded to board the bus and shoot and pilfer from the remaining passengers.

Both the driver, Kalman Esroni, and the alternate driver, Efraim Firstenberg, were killed, along with seven male passengers and two female passengers (a total of eleven died at the scene). The four survivors were two Israeli soldiers, a woman, and a 5-year-old girl, Miri, after one of the soldiers riding the bus defended her and her brother, Chaim, with his body.

After the terrorists got out of the bus, Chaim got up, called to his sister and asked her, "Are they gone?" The terrorists heard his voice, returned and shot him in the head. He did not regain consciousness, and spent 32 years in a state of paralysis and partial recognition until he died, becoming the 12th fatality of the massacre.

Tracking
The next day, Israeli trackers assisted by police dogs and accompanied by UN observers followed the attackers' tracks to a point 6 miles west of the Jordanian border, where the tracks were lost.

Relying on informants, Israeli intelligence sources named 3 suspects from the Jordanian village of Ghor es-Safi as the perpetrators, and Lt. Colonel Shalev passed the names to Elmo Hutchison. The Jordanians continued in their endeavours to discover the perpetrators of the attack.

Aftermath

Despite public outcry and call for military retaliation against Jordan, Israel's prime minister Moshe Sharett called for restraint and diplomatic measures, as less than six months before the events, Unit 101 had attacked the village of Qibya as part of Israel's retaliation policy, which resulted in the deaths of 69 people and worldwide condemnation.

"In Israel, there was a hue and cry for retaliation against Jordan. But Sharett favoured restraint, which helped to repair Israel's image in the West, opposed a reprisal while the memory of Qibya was still fresh. Uncertainty about the perpetrators identity facilitated restraint."

Israel requested that the Jordan–Israel Mixed Armistice Commission (HJK/IMAC) denounce Jordan for the crime. Jordan's representative to the HJK/IMAC pointed out the possibility of the atrocity being carried out by Israeli Bedouin, and HJK/IMAC Chairman, Commander Hutchison abstained as there was no conclusive proof, resulting in no decision. As a result, Israel left the HJK/IMAC.

Hutchison suggested that the attackers were either Gaza Bedouin or Israeli Bedouin. John Bagot Glubb suggested that the culprits were from Gaza. This theory gained credibility when, in 1956, an ID from the Ma’ale Akrabim incident was found in Gaza. Many believe Glubb had been right and Israel wrong, and that the Ma'ale Akrabim killers had indeed come from Egyptian-controlled territory rather than Jordan.

The Israeli Ministry of Foreign Affairs cited the Ma'ale Akrabim incident, among many others, as evidence that "major Arab terrorist attacks" preceded the 1967 Six-Day War, in which Israel occupied the West Bank and Gaza Strip, to challenge what they describe as common claims by Palestinian and Arab spokesmen "that the recent Palestinian terrorism is the result of the Israeli 'occupation'".

In 2007, a reconstructed bus was placed in the Eilat City Museum.

References

Bibliography
Morris, Benny (1997) Israel's Border Wars, 1949–1956: Arab Infiltration, Israeli Retaliation, and the Countdown to the Suez War, Oxford University Press. 
Hutchison E (1955) Violent Truce: A Military Observer Looks At The Arab-Israeli Conflict 1951–1955
Political Affairs By Trade Union Educational League (U.S.), Earl Browder, Herbert Aptheker, Communist Party of the United States of America, Gus Hall Published by Political Affairs Pub., 1967
Avi Plascov, (1981) The Palestinian Refugees in Jordan 1948–1957: 1948–1957 By Published by Routledge, 1981 
Miri Furstenberg, (2018) The Girl From Scorpions Pass: Surviving a desert massacre was just the beginning, Amazon Digital Services LLC 

Terrorist attacks against Israeli civilians before 1967
Massacres in Israel
1954 in Israel
Mass murder in 1954
Massacres in Israel during the Israeli–Palestinian conflict
1954 murders in Israel
Terrorist incidents in Asia in 1954
Terrorist incidents in Israel in the 1950s
Palestinian Fedayeen insurgency
Massacres in 1954
March 1954 events in Asia
Attacks on buses by Palestinian militant groups